Live Under the Sky was an annual jazz festival held in summer, July and August, at the Denen Coliseum and Yomiuriland in Tokyo and other areas in Japan.  The multiple day festival featured musicians from Japan and other countries performing on different stages. It was held from 1977 – 1992.

Live Under the Sky, Newport Jazz Festival in Madarao (established in 1982) and Mount Fuji Jazz Festival (established in 1986) are the big three jazz festivals in the history of jazz in Japan.

Notable artists
Notable artists at Live Under the Sky were Buzz Feiten, Kimiko Kasai, "V.S.O.P." quintet, Pedro Aznar, Masahiko Togashi, Terumasa Hino, Sadao Watanabe, McCoy Tyner, Ron Carter, Elis Regina, Chick Corea, John McLaughlin, Stanley Clarke, Toshiyuki Honda, Sonny Rollins, Paco de Lucía, Carlos Santana in 1981, Weather Report, The Crusaders, Gil Evans, Jaco Pastorius, Black Uhuru, Sly and Robbie, Miles Davis, John Scofield, Roberta Flack, Al Di Meola, Branford Marsalis, Ornette Coleman, Miles Davis, Ryuichi Sakamoto, Samul nori, Wayne Shorter, Jack DeJohnette, Kazumi Watanabe, Eugene Pao, Eddie Gómez, Marlon Jordan, Pat Metheny, Lyle Mays, David Sanborn, Don Alias, Sun Ra, Marshall Allen, Danny Thompson, Billy Bang, Marilyn Mazur, Michael Brecker, Mike Stern, Leon "Ndugu" Chancler, Don Grolnick, Yoshio Suzuki, Gunther Schuller, Roberta Flack, Masahiko Satoh, Alex Acuna, Nana Vasconcelos, Kazutoki Umezu, Al Jarreau, Philippe Saisse, Steve Gadd, Michel Godard, Milton Nascimento, Omar Hakim, Marcus Miller, Lalah Hathaway, Dean Brown, Everette Harp, Larry Coryell, Billy Cobham, Paul Wertico, Harold Smiley Davis.

Related recordings
Live Under the Sky, 1978 double album by Galaxy All-Stars in Tokyo, including Red Garland, Hank Jones, Roy Haynes and others
V.S.O.P. Live Under the Sky, 1979 album by V.S.O.P. Quintet rereleased in 2004
Live Under the Sky Tokyo '84, album by Gil Evans and Jaco Pastorius
Tribute to John Coltrane - Live Under the Sky, 1987 recording by Wayne Shorter, Dave Liebman and others
Select Live Under the Sky '90 album by Masahiko Satoh/Randooga, with Wayne Shorter
Live Under the Sky Tokyo '92
1 + 3, album by Ron Carter (recorded on 29 July 1978)
Carnaval (Ron Carter album), album by Ron Carter (recorded on 30 July 1978)

References

External links
history (OUR HISTORY) (Official site Koinuma Music)
Live Under The Sky (fan site)

1977 establishments in Japan
Recurring events disestablished in 1992
Jazz festivals in Japan
Summer festivals
Music festivals established in 1977
1992 disestablishments in Japan